In image processing, elongatedness for a region is the ratio between the length and width of the minimum bounding rectangle of the region. It is considered a feature of the region. It can be evaluated as the ratio between the area of the region to its thickness squared:

.

where the maximum thickness, of a holeless region is given by the number of times the region can be eroded before disappearing.

References 

Image processing